Renwal is an ILRC and village in Phagi Tehsil in Jaipur district, Rajasthan, India.

Renwal has seven patwar circles: Gopal Nagar, Gohandi, Thala, Mohabbatpura, Renwal, Harsooliya and Heerapura.

Based on the Census of India, 2011, Renwal has 842 households with total population of 6,198 (52.02% males, 47.98% females). Total area of village is 20.26 km2. There is one primary school, one commercial bank and one post office in the village.

There is a temple dedicated to Hanuman.

Villages in Renwal

References

Cities and towns in Jaipur district